Prince Kwabena Owusu (born 28 February 1997) is a Ghanaian professional footballer who plays as a winger for Zambian club Kabwe Youth Soccer Academy F.C.

Club career

Early career
Born in kumasi, Ashanti, Owusu began his career at local club in Obuasi, Ashanti, Atoplans F.C. before later joining Golden Stars Int. FC in Kumasi, Ashanti.
On 2 February 2016, Owusu left Golden Stars Int. FC, to join Mpuasuman United. Owusu spent just a season with the second-tier side Mpuasuaman United, his name became a household name.
On 1 January 2017, Owusu left Mpuasuaman United, to sign a contract with Ashanti Gold S.C.

Ashanti Gold
In January 2017, Owusu was transferred to Ghana Premier League club Ashanti Gold on a three-year deal. He made his debut appearance against Ghana Premier League club, Medeama S.C. and scored an equalizer for his club in the 2017–18 season.
Owusu gained a place in the first team after his outstanding performance in his debut game but injuries later made him lose his spot.
Owusu's first season at Ashanti Gold didn't really go well as he targeted because of injuries but he managed to score a few goals.
Elmina Sharks F.C. even showed interest of signing Owusu.
Prior to the 2018–19 season, Owusu was very fit and well prepared for the season but unfortunately for him, he got injured again and things weren't the same anymore.
Owusu and Ashanti Gold mutually terminated contract on 6 August 2019.

Kabwe YSA
On 28 January 2020, Kabwe YSA F.C. signed Owusu for one and half seasons.

Career statistics

Club

References

External links
Ghana Football Association – official website
 Global Sports Archive
Football Critic

1997 births
Living people
Ghanaian footballers
Association football wingers
Ashanti Gold SC players
Footballers from Kumasi